Adolfo Flores (born 12 February 1942) is a Bolivian footballer. He played in one match for the Bolivia national football team in 1967. He was also part of Bolivia's squad for the 1967 South American Championship.

References

1942 births
Living people
Bolivian footballers
Bolivia international footballers
Place of birth missing (living people)
Association football midfielders
Chaco Petrolero players
Club Blooming managers